Live from New York City is a concert film directed by Hamish Hamilton, documenting American rapper Eminem's live concert at the Madison Square Garden in New York City on August 8 and 9 as part of his third Anger Management Tour. The taped event, also featuring a supporting cast of D12, Obie Trice, Stat Quo and Alchemist, was originally premiered on Showtime on December 3, 2005. It was released on DVD on November 13, 2007 and on Blu-ray on October 19, 2009 via Eagle Rock Entertainment.

The third edition of Anger Management Tour concerts, including Live from New York City, were in support of Eminem's fifth solo studio album Ǝncore. This video marks Eminem's fourth and to-date final concert film, as well as the last performance to feature Proof before his death in 2006.

Track listing

Cast
 Marshall Mathers – main performer, executive producer
 DeShaun Holton – hypeman, featured performer
 Stanley Benton – featured performer
 Denaun Porter – featured performer
 Rufus Johnson – featured performer
 Von Carlisle – featured performer
 Ondre Moore – featured performer
 Obie Trice – featured performer
 Alan Maman – DJ

Personnel
 Hamish Hamilton – director
 Hayley Collett – associate director
 Paul Rosenberg – executive producer, management
 Stuart Parr – executive producer
 Richie Namm – producer
 Mace Camhe – producer
 Luca Scalisi – co-producer
 Marc Labelle – associate producer, management
 Neil Maman – management

Charts

Release history

References

External links 
 

Concert films
2005 live albums
2005 video albums
Live video albums
Eminem video albums
Eagle Rock Entertainment live albums
Eagle Rock Entertainment video albums
Albums recorded at Madison Square Garden
Films directed by Hamish Hamilton (director)